Danilo Carvalho Barcelos (born 17 August 1991), known as Danilo Barcelos, is a Brazilian footballer who plays for Ceará. As either a left back or a midfielder.

Club career
Danilo was born in Coronel Fabriciano, Minas Gerais. An América Mineiro youth graduate, he made his senior debut while on loan at Francana in 2011; subsequent loans followed, at Poços de Caldas and Anápolis.

Danilo returned to Coelho in 2013, and made his first team debut on 25 May 2013 by starting and being sent off in a 0–1 away loss against Guaratinguetá for the Série B championship. He finished the campaign with 35 appearances and one goal, against Bragantino on 6 October.

On 10 February 2014, Danilo was loaned to Série A club Sport Recife until the end of the year. He made his debut in the competition on 27 April, coming on as a second-half substitute for Renan Oliveira in a 2–1 home win against Chapecoense.

Danilo scored his first goal in the main category of Brazilian football on 31 August 2014, netting the last in a 2–0 home win against Criciúma. He only returned to América in 2016, with the club in the top tier.

Danilo played 51 games and scored ten gols for América during the 2016 season, three of them in the finals of the 2016 Campeonato Mineiro, against Atlético Mineiro, playing a key role in the club's first state league trophy in 15 years. On 21 December of that year, however, he was announced as new player of Atlético Mineiro for the upcoming season.

After failing to make his breakthrough at Galo, Danilo subsequently served loans at Ponte Preta (two stints) and Vasco da Gama.

On 9 March 2022, Barcelos joined Goiás on loan until the end of 2022.

Honours
Anápolis
Campeonato Goiano Segunda Divisão: 2012

Sport
Copa do Nordeste: 2014
Campeonato Pernambucano: 2014

América Mineiro
Campeonato Mineiro: 2016

Atlético Mineiro
Campeonato Mineiro: 2017

Vasco da Gama
Taça Guanabara: 2019

References

External links
Futebol de Goyaz profile 

1991 births
Living people
Sportspeople from Minas Gerais
Brazilian footballers
Association football defenders
Association football midfielders
Campeonato Brasileiro Série A players
Campeonato Brasileiro Série B players
América Futebol Clube (MG) players
Associação Atlética Francana players
Anápolis Futebol Clube players
Clube Atlético Mineiro players
Sport Club do Recife players
Associação Atlética Ponte Preta players
CR Vasco da Gama players
Botafogo de Futebol e Regatas players
Fluminense FC players
Goiás Esporte Clube players
Ceará Sporting Club players